Nam-gi, also spelled Nam-ki, is a Korean masculine given name. Its meaning differs based on the hanja used to write each syllable of the name. There are five hanja with the reading "nam" and 68 hanja with the reading "ki" on the South Korean government's official list of hanja which may be registered for use in given names.

People with this name include:
Zhao Nanqi (born 1927; in Korean Cho Nam-gi), Chinese People's Liberation Army general of Korean descent
Pak Nam-gi (1934–2010), North Korean official, Director of the Workers' Party of Korea's Planning and Finance Department
Namgi Park, South Korean professor of education

See also
List of Korean given names

References

Korean masculine given names